UNESCO Nomenclature (more properly UNESCO nomenclature for fields of science and technology) is a system developed by UNESCO for classification of research papers and doctoral dissertations. There are three versions of the system, offering different levels of refinement through 2-, 4-, and 6-digit codes.

Two-digit system
11 Logic 
12 Mathematics 
21 Astronomy, Astrophysics 
22 Physics 
23 Chemistry 
24 Life Sciences 
25 Earth and space science 
31 Agricultural Sciences 
32 Medical Sciences 
33 Technological Sciences 
51 Anthropology 
52 Demography 
53 Economic Sciences 
54 Geography 
55 History 
56 Juridical Science and Law 
57 Linguistics 
58 Pedagogy 
59 Political Science 
61 Psychology 
62 Sciences of Arts and Letters 
63 Sociology 
71 Ethics 
72 Philosophy

See also 
4-digit UNESCO Nomenclature
6-digit UNESCO Nomenclature
UNESCO Standard Classification of Education

External links
 SKOS versión of nomenclature for browse online and download (English, Spanish and French)
Original document (from 1988) – full 6-digit nomenclature

References